Bang Sue MRT station (code BL11) is a Bangkok MRT rapid transit station on the MRT Blue Line, located near Bang Sue Junction railway station, Bangkok. It connects to SRT Dark Red Line and SRT Light Red Line at Krung Thep Aphiwat Central Terminal located above the station. Its symbol color is blue.

Station details 
Its symbol color is blue It is an underground station 30 by 226m and 12m deep. The platforms are side platforms.

Station layout
Before August 2017, Bang Sue station operated only one platform. Currently, the full extension to Tha Phra station is in operation and both platforms are in use.
Platform 1 is for services to Lak Song via Phahon Yothin and Hua Lamphong. 
Platform 2 is for services to Tha Phra station via Tao Poon.

Bus connections
The following BMTA and Private Jointed routes serve this station:

 50 (Rama VII Bridge - Lumphini Park)
 52 (Pak Kret - MRT Bang Sue Station) 
 65 (Nonthaburi Pak Nam Temple - Sanam Luang) 
 67 (SRT Wat Samian Nari Station - Central Plaza Rama III)
 70 (Pracha Niwet 3 Village - Sanam Luang) 
 97 (Ministry of Public Health - Priest Hospital) (BMTA Ordinary Bus / Private Jointed Bus / Thaismile Bus)
 97 (Ministry of Public Health - Victory Monument) (BMTA Air-Con Bus)
 1-33 (Bang Khen - MRT Bang Sue Station) 
 2-17 (112 Old) (MRT Bang Sue Station - Pracha Nukul Intersection - Kasetsart University) (Loop)

Nearby landmarks 
 Bang Sue Junction railway station
 Krung Thep Aphiwat Central Terminal
 Siam Cement

References 

MRT (Bangkok) stations
2004 establishments in Thailand
Railway stations opened in 2004